The 1939 Kent State Golden Flashes football team was an American football team that represented Kent State University in the Ohio Athletic Conference (OAC) during the 1939 college football season. In its fifth season under head coach Donald Starn, Kent State compiled a 3–4–1 record (1–3–1 against OAC opponents). The team compiled a 3–1–1 record through the end of October, but then lost all three November games, including back-to-back shutouts against rival Bowling Green (0–34) and Western Reserve (0–38).

Schedule

References

Kent State
Kent State Golden Flashes football seasons
Kent State Golden Flashes football